Hotel Imperial is a 1927 American silent war drama film directed by Mauritz Stiller and released by Paramount Pictures. The film is set in Austria-Hungary during World War I and starring Pola Negri as a hotel chambermaid. It is based on the 1917 Hungarian play of the same name by Lajos Bíró.

Plot
Officer Paul Almasy (Hall) is separated from his unit behind enemy lines and hides in the Hotel Imperial in Lemberg (nowadays Lviv, Ukraine), where chambermaid Anna (Negri) disguises him as a waiter. The invading Russian troops make the hotel their headquarters. Paul later kills the Russian spy Petroff and Anna arranges the room to depict the death as being a suicide. Later, when the Russians accuse Paul of the killing, Anna provides an alibi by saying that Paul was instead with her in her room and while so doing rips the fine clothing that General Juschkiewitsch (Siegmann) has provided her. She later helps Paul elude the Russians and leave the hotel so that he can rejoin his unit. After Austrian troops regain the city, the lovers are reunited and their bravery is recognized.

Cast
Pola Negri as Anna Sedlak
James Hall as Lieutenant Paul Almasy
George Siegmann as General Juschkiewitsch
Max Davidson as Elias Butterman
Michael Vavitch as Tabakowitsch
Otto Fries as Anton Klinak
Nicholas Soussanin as Baron Fredrikson
Golden Wadhams as Major General Sultanov
George Berrell as Old Man with White Hair
Josef Swickard as Austrian General (uncredited)
Carl von Haartman as Russian Soldier (uncredited)

Production
The film used the same exterior town square set from Negri's film The Spanish Dancer (1923).

Commentary
In a departure from her former vampish roles, and Negri depicted Anna as tense and fidgeting, experiencing the anxiety of war time noncombatents, a woman surrounded by foreign army men in the hotel. She watches carefully and, when she sees the need, takes decisive action to avoid sexual assault and save her lover and, indirectly, her nation.

Preservation
Hotel Imperial is one of Negri's few Paramount films to survive and is preserved in several film archives.

References

External links

1927 films
1927 war films
American war drama films
American silent feature films
American black-and-white films
American films based on plays
Films directed by Mauritz Stiller
Films set in hotels
Films set on the Austro-Hungarian home front during World War I
World War I films set on the Eastern Front
Films set in Austria
Films set in Poland
Films set in Ukraine
Films with screenplays by Jules Furthman
Paramount Pictures films
Films produced by Erich Pommer
1927 drama films
1920s American films
Silent American drama films
Silent war drama films
1920s English-language films
1920s war drama films